The Belfort Gap or Burgundian Gate is the area of relatively flat terrain in Eastern France between the Vosges Mountains to the north and the Jura Mountains to the south. It marks the watershed between the drainage basins of the River Rhine to the east and the River Rhône to the west, part of the European Watershed between the North Sea and the Mediterranean Sea. It is also the boundary between the historic regions of Burgundy to the west and Alsace to the east, and as such has marked the Franco-German border for long periods of its history.

Geography
The Belfort Gap or Burgundian Gate is the area of relatively flat terrain in France between the Vosges Mountains to the north and the Jura Mountains to the south, connecting Franche-Comté in the West and Alsace in the east. It marks the watershed between the drainage basins of the River Rhône to the west and the River Rhine to the east. It is thus part of the European Watershed between the North Sea and the Mediterranean Sea.

The passage allows warm Mediterranean air flows to advect northeastwards into the Upper Rhine Plain and the Middle Rhine Valley.

Lines of communication that traverse the Belfort Gap include the French Route nationale 83 and the A36 autoroute, the railway line from Basel to Paris and the LGV Rhin-Rhône high-speed railway, as well as the Rhône-Rhine Canal.

History
The Belfort Gap is first recorded as playing a military role in 58 BC, when Julius Caesar marched his army through it to confront the Germanic chieftain Ariovistus, whom he defeated at the Battle of the Vosges probably fought in the vicinity of modern Mulhouse. Over the following decades the area west of the Rhine was incorporated into the Roman Empire. When the Western Roman Empire collapsed in the 5th century,  the Germanic Alemanni settled in the area immediately east of the Belfort Gap during the ensuing Migration Period, while the Burgundians passed through it and established the Kingdom of the Burgundians to the west. 

In the early 6th century, both Burgundy and Alemannia were conquered by the Kingdom of Francia, but the Belfort Gap remained the linguistic border between Germanic and Romance languages.

Francia grew to become the Carolingian Empire until it fell apart in the late ninth century, whereupon the Belfort Gap again became a border, this time between East Francia (later the Kingdom of Germany) to the east and the Kingdom of Burgundy-Arles to the west. By 1033 both kingdoms had been incorporated into the Holy Roman Empire. Thereafter local subdivisions started to become more important, which on the Arlésien side meant the County of Burgundy, and from 1042 also the County of Montbéliard; the territory on the German side was initially part of the stem duchy of Swabia, later the Alsatian Sundgau ("the southern Gau").

During the Late Middle Ages, in 1324 the Austrian House of Habsburg acquired first the Sundgau and in 1493 the County of Burgundy (more usually known in this period as the Franche-Comté).  Under the 1648 Peace of Westphalia, the Habsburgs were obliged to cede the Sundgau to the Kingdom of France and the Belfort Gap therefore became the border between French Alsace and Habsburg Franche-Comté, but not for long: under the 1678 Treaties of Nijmegen France acquired Franche-Comté too.

The Belfort Gap acquired renewed significance in the series of Franco-German wars in the nineteenth and early twentieth centuries. During the Franco-Prussian War, the Prussian army invaded France via the Wissembourg Gap and then swept down the length of Alsace and laid siege to Belfort, hoping to seize the city and then rush on through the Belfort Gap into central France. The siege ended up dragging on for months, and an armistice was signed before it could be brought to a decisive conclusion. The wider war had delivered a conclusive result, however, and under the resulting Treaty of Versailles (1871) Alsace and Lorraine were ceded by France to the newly-established German Empire. In 1871, the language border was used to determine the demarcation line between Alsace and Burgundy, and France was thereby able to retain Belfort. It had however become a border town again, and a series of fortifications was therefore thrown up to protect it from any future German attack.

20th century
At the outbreak of the First World War, French troops invaded Germany through the Belfort Gap, leading to the bloody Battles of the Frontiers. The most recent military advance through the Belfort Gap was that of the French I Corps in November 1944, under General De Lattre.

References

Plateaus of Metropolitan France
Landforms of Grand Est
Landforms of Bourgogne-Franche-Comté